Písková Lhota is a municipality and village in Mladá Boleslav District in the Central Bohemian Region of the Czech Republic. It has about 1,000 inhabitants.

Administrative parts
The village of Zámostí is an administrative part of Písková Lhota.

Geography

It lies in the Jizera Table. The municipality is situated on the left bank of the Jizera River, which forms the western municipal border. There is a pond in the centre of the village.

History
The first written mention of Písková Lhota is from 1398, Zámostí was first mentioned in 1361. Starý Stránov Castle was first documented in 1297. Písková Lhota as a typical agricultural village, Zámostí was probably mainly home of craftsmen.

Demographics

Transport
The D10 motorway passes through the municipality.

Sights

The most important monument is the ruin of the Starý Stránov Castle. Several houses were built into the ruins, for the construction of which building material from the castle was used.

Among the other monuments in Písková Lhota are a small Jewish cemetery and a Baroque building of a former inn from the mid-18th century.

References

External links

Villages in Mladá Boleslav District